Göran Tell is a Swedish former sailor in the Star class. He won the 1969 Star European Championships crewing for Börje Larsson.

References

Swedish male sailors (sport)
Star class sailors
Possibly living people
Year of birth missing